Sam Walker (born 7 May 1995) is a British table tennis player. He competed for England in the men's team event at the 2014 Commonwealth Games where he won a silver medal.

In March 2016, Walker was part of the England team, alongside Liam Pitchford and Paul Drinkhall, which won bronze medals at the World Team Championships in Malaysia, England's first medal at that level since 1983 and the first time a newly promoted team had earned a podium place at the event.

In June 2016, Walker was called up to the Team GB table tennis squad for the Rio Olympic Games. He featured in the team competition, sealing a 3–2 victory over France in the first round  before GB were knocked out by China in the quarter-finals.

In February 2018, Walker was part of the England squad alongside Paul Drinkhall, Liam Pitchford, David McBeath and Tom Jarvis which won bronze medals by reaching the semi-finals of the ITTF Team World Cup in front of a home crowd at the Copper Box Arena in London.

At the Commonwealth Games in Australia in 2018, Walker was part of the England squad which won men's team bronze, alongside Paul Drinkhall, Liam Pitchford and David McBeath. and was fourth in the men's singles, having been defeated in the bronze medal match.

In 2021, Walker became the first English player to win a doubles title on the international circuit since the advent of the ITTF World Tour in 1996, when he and Sweden's Truls Moregard won the men's doubles at the Czech Open.

At the Birmingham 2022 Commonwealth Games, Walker won team bronze alongside Liam Pitchford, Paul Drinkhall and Tom Jarvis.

See also
 List of England players at the World Team Table Tennis Championships

References

External links

1995 births
Living people
English male table tennis players
Commonwealth Games silver medallists for England
Table tennis players at the 2014 Commonwealth Games
Table tennis players at the 2022 Commonwealth Games
Olympic table tennis players of Great Britain
Table tennis players at the 2016 Summer Olympics
Commonwealth Games medallists in table tennis
Table tennis players at the 2019 European Games
European Games competitors for Great Britain
Medallists at the 2014 Commonwealth Games
Medallists at the 2022 Commonwealth Games